Corsican (corsu , ; full name: lingua corsa) is a Romance language constituted by the continuum of the Italo-Dalmatian dialects spoken on the Mediterranean island of Corsica (France) and on the northern end of the island of Sardinia (Italy). Corsican is related to the Tuscan varieties from the Italian peninsula, and therefore also to the Florentine-based standard Italian. 

Under the long-standing sway of Tuscany's Pisa and Republic of Genoa over Corsica, Corsican used to play the role of a vernacular in combination with Italian functioning as the island's official language. In 1859, Italian was replaced by French, owing to the French acquisition from the Republic of Genoa in 1768. Over the next two centuries, the use of French in the place of Italian grew to the extent that, by the Liberation in 1945, all the islanders had a working knowledge of French. The 20th century saw a language shift, with the islanders changing their language practices to the extent that there were no monolingual Corsican speakers left by the 1960s. By 1995, an estimated 65 percent of islanders had some degree of proficiency in Corsican, and a minority amounting to around 10 percent used Corsican as a first language.

Classification by subjective analysis 

As for Corsican, a bone of contention is whether it should be considered an Italian dialect or its own language, even while by French law it is a regional language. While there is near universal agreement that Corsican is typologically and traditionally Italo-Romance, its specific position therein is more controversial. Some scholars argue that Corsican belongs to the Centro-Southern Italian dialects, while others are of the opinion that it is closely related to Italy's Tuscan varieties, if not reputed to be part thereof. Mutual intelligibility between Italian and the dialects of Corsican is in fact very high, with particular reference to Northern Corsican. As for Southern Corsican, it has been noted that in spite of the geographical proximity its closest linguistic neighbour is not Sardinian, which constitutes a separate group and is not mutually intelligible at all, but rather the Extreme Southern Italian lects like Siculo-Calabrian. It has been theorised, on the other hand, that a Sardinian variety, or a variety very similar to Sardo-Romance, might have been originally spoken in Corsica prior to the island's Tuscanisation under Pisan and Genoese rule.

The matter is controversial in light of the historical, cultural and particularly strong linguistic bonds that Corsica had traditionally formed with the Italian Mainland from the Middle Ages until the 19th century: in contrast to the neighbouring Sardinia, Corsica's installment into a diglossic system with Italian as the island's prestige language ran so deep that both Corsican and Italian might be even, and in fact were, perceived as two sociolinguistic levels of a single language. Corsican and Italian traditionally existed on a spectrum, whose proximity line was blurred enough that the locals needed little else but a change of register to communicate in an official setting. "Tuscanising" their tongue, or as the Corsican elites would have once said, parlà in crusca ("speaking in crusca", from the name of the Academy dedicated to the standardisation of the Italian language), allowed for a practice not of code-switching, but rather of code-mixing which is quite typical of the Mainland Italian dialects. Italian was perceived as "other" from Corsican, but not more so than the two main isoglosses of Northern and Southern Corsican were between each other by their respective native speakers. When Pasquale Paoli found himself exiled in London, he replied to Samuel Johnson's query on the peculiar existence of a "rustic language" very different from Italian that such a language existed only in Sardinia; in fact, the existence of Corsican as the island's native vernacular did not take anything away from Paoli's claims that Corsica's official language was Italian.

Today's Corsican is the result of these historical vicissitudes, which have morphed the language to an idiom that bears a strong resemblance to the medieval Tuscan once spoken at the time of Dante and Boccaccio, and still existing in peripheral Tuscany (Lucca, Garfagnana, Elba, Capraia). The correspondence of modern Corsican to ancient Tuscan can be seen from almost any aspect of the language, ranging from the phonetics, morphology, lexicon to the syntax. One of the characteristics of standard Italian is the retention of the -re infinitive ending, as in Latin mittere "send"; such infinitival ending is lost in Tuscan as well as Corsican, resulting in the outcome mette / metta, "to put". Whereas the relative pronoun in Italian for "who" is chi and "what" is che/(che) cosa, it is an uninflected chì in Corsican. The only unifying, as well as distinctive, feature which separates the Corsican dialects from the mainland Tuscan ones, with the exception of Amiatino, Pitiglianese, and Capraiese, is the retention of word-final o-u. For example, the Italian demonstrative pronouns questo "this" and quello "that" become in Corsican questu or quistu and quellu or quiddu: this feature was also typical of the early Italian texts during the Middle Ages.

Even after the acquisition of Corsica by Louis XV, Italian continued to be the island's language of education, literature, religion and local affairs. The affluent youth, such as the future Emperor of the French, still went to Italy to pursue higher studies (it has been estimated that Corsican presence in Pisa amounted to a fourth of the University's total student body in 1830), and local civil registers would not stop being written in Italian until 1855; it was on May 9, 1859 that Italian was replaced by French as the island's official language, even though the latter would start to take root among the islanders from 1882 onwards, through the Jules Ferry's laws aimed at spreading literacy across the French provinces. Even so, a specifically homegrown Corsican rather than Italian literature in Corsica would not be born but belatedly and, in its earliest phase, would not carry autonomous cultural instances; Corsican writers, such as Salvatore Viale, even prided themselves on their affiliation to the broader Italian sphere, considering Corsican «one of the least impure dialects of Italy».

It was the Italian Fascist aggressive claims to the island in the 20th century, followed by their invasion, that provoked a popular backlash estranging the native islanders from standard Italian and, if anything, only accelerated their shifting to the French national language even further. By the Liberation, any previously existing link between the two linguistic varieties and with Italy altogether had been severed; any promotion of Corsican, which had been politicized by the local collaborators with the regime, would be met with popular criticism and even suspicion of potentially harboring irredentist sentiments. From then on, Corsican would grow autonomously from Italian to become later in the 1970s a centerpiece of the Riacquistu ("reacquisition") movement for the rediscovery of Corsican culture. Nationalist calls for Corsican to be put on the same footing as French led the French National Assembly to extend the 1951 Deixonne Law, which initially recognized only a few languages (Breton, Basque, Catalan and Occitan), to including Corsican as well, among others, not as a dialect of Italian, but as one of France's full-fledged regional languages in 1974 (see governmental support).

Origins 

The common relationship between Corsica and central Italy can be traced from as far back as the Etruscans, who asserted their presence on the island in as early as 500 BC. In 40 AD, the natives of Corsica did not reportedly speak Latin. The Roman exile, Seneca the Younger, reports that both coast and interior were occupied by natives whose language he was not able to understand. More specifically, Seneca claimed that the island's population was the result of the stratification of different ethnic groups, such as the Greeks, the Ligures (see the Ligurian hypothesis) and the Iberians, whose language had long since stopped being recognizable among the population due to the intermixing of the other two groups. The occupation of the island by the Vandals around the year 469 marked the end of authoritative influence by Latin speakers (see Medieval Corsica). If the natives of that time spoke Latin, they must have acquired it during the late empire.

Modern Corsican has been influenced by the languages of the major powers taking an interest in Corsican affairs; earlier by those of the medieval Italian powers, such as the Papal States (828–1077), the Republic of Pisa (1077–1282) and the Republic of Genoa (1282–1768), and finally by France which, since 1859, has promulgated the official Parisian French. The term "gallicised Corsican" refers to the evolution of Corsican starting from about the year 1950, whereas "distanciated Corsican" refers to an idealized variety of Corsican following linguistic purism, by means of removing any French-derived elements.

Dialects

Corsica
The two most widely spoken forms of the Corsican language are the groups spoken in the Bastia and Corte area (generally throughout the northern half of the island, known as Haute-Corse, Cismonte or Corsica suprana), and the groups spoken around Sartène and Porto-Vecchio (generally throughout the southern half of the island, known as Corse-du-Sud, Pumonti or ). The dialect of Ajaccio has been described as in transition. The dialects spoken at Calvi and Bonifacio are closer to the Genoese dialect, also known as Ligurian.

This division along the Girolata-Porto Vecchio line was due to the massive immigration from Tuscany which took place in Corsica during the lower Middle Ages: as a result, the northern Corsican dialects became very close to a central Italian dialect like Tuscan, while the southern Corsican varieties could keep the original characteristics of the language which make it much more similar to Sicilian and, only to some extent, Sardinian.

Northern Corsican
The Northern Corsican macro variety (Supranacciu, Supranu, Cismuntincu or Cismontano) is the most widespread on the island and standardised as well, and is spoken in North-West Corsica around the districts of Bastia and Corte. The dialects of Bastia and Cap Corse belong to the Western Tuscan dialects; they being, with the exception of Florentine, the closest to standard Italian.

Transitional area
Across the Northern and Southern borders of the line separating the Northern dialects from the Southern ones, there is a transitional area picking up linguistic phenomena associated with either of the two groups, with some local peculiarities. Along the Northern line are the dialects around Piana and Calcatoggio, from Cinarca with Vizzavona (which form the conditional tense like in the South), and Fiumorbo through Ghisonaccia and Ghisoni, which have the retroflex  sound (written -dd-) for historical ; along the Southern line, the dialects of Ajaccio (retroflex -dd-, realized as -ghj-, feminine plurals ending in i, some Northern words like cane and accattà instead of ghjacaru and cumprà, as well as ellu/ella and not eddu/edda; minor variations: sabbatu > sabbitu, u li dà > ghi lu dà; final syllables often stressed and truncated: marinari > marinà,  > panattè, castellu > castè, cuchjari > cuchjà), the Gravona area, Bastelica (which would be classified as Southern, but is also noted for its typical rhotacism: Basterga) and Solenzara, which did not preserve the Latin short vowels: seccu, peru, rossu, croci, pozzu).

Southern Corsican

The Southern Corsican macro variety (Suttanacciu, Suttanu, Pumontincu or Oltramontano) is the most archaic and conservative group, spoken in the districts of Sartène and Porto-Vecchio. Unlike the Northern varieties and similarly to Sardinian, the group retains the distinction of the Latin short vowels ĭ and ŭ (e.g. pilu, bucca). It is also strongly marked by the presence of the voiced retroflex stop, like Sicilian (e.g. aceddu, beddu, quiddu, ziteddu, famidda), and the conditional tense formed in -ìa (e.g. (idda) amarìa "she would love"). All the Oltramontani dialects are from an area located to the South of Porticcio, Bastelica, Col di Verde and Solenzara. Notable dialects are those from around Taravo (retroflex -dd- only for historical : frateddu, suredda, beddu; preservation of the palatal lateral approximant: piglià, famiglia, figliolu, ; does not preserve the Latin short vowels: seccu, peru, rossu, croci, pozzu), Sartène (preserving the Latin short vowels: siccu, piru, russu, cruci, puzzu; changing historical -rn- to -rr-: forru, carri, corru; substituting the stop for the palatal lateral approximant: piddà, famidda, fiddolu, voddu; imperfect tense like cantàvami, cantàvani; masculine plurals ending in a: l'ochja, i poma; having eddu/edda/eddi as personal pronouns), the Alta Rocca (the most conservative area in Corsica, being very close to the varieties spoken in Northern Sardinia), and the Southern region located between the hinterlands of Porto-Vecchio and Bonifacio (masculine singulars always ending in u: fiumu, paesu, patronu; masculine plurals always ending in a: i letta, i solda, i ponta, i foca, i mura, i loca, i balcona; imperfect tense like cantàiami, cantàiani).

Sardinia

Some Italo-Romance languages that might have originated from Southern Corsican, but are also heavily influenced by the Sardinian language, are spoken in the neighbouring island of Sardinia.

Gallurese is spoken in the extreme north of the island, including the region of Gallura, while Sassarese is spoken in Sassari and in its neighbourhood, in the northwest of Sardinia. Their geographical position in Sardinia has been theorised to be the result of different migration waves from the already tuscanized Corsicans and the Tuscans, who then proceeded to settle in Sardinia and slowly displace the indigenous Logudorese Sardinian varieties spoken therein (at present, Luras is the only town in the middle of Gallura that has retained the original language).

On the Maddalena archipelago, which was culturally Corsican but had been annexed to the Savoyard Kingdom of Sardinia a short while before Corsica was ceded by Genoa to France in 1767, the local dialect (called isulanu or maddaleninu) was brought by fishermen and shepherds from Bonifacio over a long period of immigration in the 17th and 18th centuries. Though influenced by Gallurese, it has maintained the original characteristics of Southern Corsican. In the dialect of maddalenino, as it is known in Italian, there are also numerous words of Genoese and Ponzese origin.

Although Gallurese and Sassarese both belong to Italo-Dalmatian, which is a group typologically different from Sardinian, it has long been a subject of debate whether the two should be included as dialects either of Corsican or of Sardinian or, in light of their historical development, even considered languages of their own. It has been argued that all these varieties should be placed in a single category, Southern Romance, but such classification has not garnered universal support among linguists.

On 14 October 1997, Article 2 Item 4 of Law Number 26 of the Autonomous Region of Sardinia granted "the Sassarese and Gallurese dialects" («al dialetto sassarese e a quello gallurese») equal legal status with the other languages indigenous to Sardinia. Thus, even though they would technically not be covered by the national law pertaining to the historical linguistic minorities, among which is Sardinian, Sassarese and Gallurese are nonetheless recognized by the Sardinian government on a regional level.

Examples of the main Corsican varieties compared with standard Italian and Elba's Tuscan dialect

Number of speakers 
The situation of Corsican with regard to French as the country's national language is analogous to that of many other French regions and provinces, which have or used to have a traditional language of their own, even though the islanders' switch from their local idiom to regional French has happened relatively later and the presence of Corsican, albeit declining, is still strongly felt among the population. In 1980, about 70 percent of the island's population "had some command of the Corsican language." In 1990, out of a total population of about 254,000, the percentage had declined to 50 percent, with 10 percent of the island's residents using it as a first language. The language appeared to be in serious decline when the French government reversed its unsupportive stand and initiated some strong measures to save it.

The January 2007 estimated population of Corsica was 281,000, whereas the figure for the March 1999 census, when most of the studies—though not the linguistic survey work referenced in this article—were performed, was about 261,000. Only a fraction of the population at either time spoke Corsican with any fluency.

According to an official survey run on behalf of the Collectivité territoriale de Corse which took place in April 2013, in Corsica, the Corsican language had a number of speakers between 86,800 and 130,200, out of a total population amounting to 309,693 inhabitants. 28% of the overall population was able to speak Corsican well, whilst an additional 14% had a capacity to speak it "quite well." The percentage of those who had a solid oral understanding of the language varies between a minimum of 25 percent in the 25–34 age group and the maximum of 65 percent in the over-65 age group: almost a quarter of the former age group reported that they were not able to understand Corsican, while only a small minority of the older people did not understand it. While 32 percent of the population of Northern Corsica was reported to speak Corsican quite well, this percentage dropped to 22 percent for Southern Corsica. Moreover, 10 percent of the population of Corsica spoke only French, while 62 percent code-switched between French and at least some Corsican. 8 percent of the Corsicans knew how to write correctly in Corsican, while about 60 percent of the population did not know how to write in Corsican. While 90 percent of the population was in favor of a Corsican-French bilingualism, 3 percent would have liked to have only Corsican as the official language in the island, and 7 percent would have preferred French to have this role.

UNESCO classifies Corsican as a "definitely endangered language." The Corsican language is a key vehicle for Corsican culture, which is notably rich in proverbs and in polyphonic song.

Governmental support 

When the French Assembly passed the Deixonne Law in 1951, which made it possible for regional languages to be taught at school, Alsatian, Flemish and Corsican were not included on the ground of being classified as dialectes allogènes of German, Dutch and Italian respectively, i.e. dialects of foreign languages and not languages in themselves. Only in 1974 were they too politically recognized as regional languages for their teaching on a voluntary basis.

The 1991 "Joxe Statute", in setting up the Collectivité Territoriale de Corse, also provided for the Corsican Assembly, and charged it with developing a plan for the optional teaching of Corsican. The University of Corsica Pasquale Paoli at Corte, Haute-Corse took a central role in the planning.

At the primary school level Corsican is taught up to a fixed number of hours per week (three in the year 2000) and is a voluntary subject at the secondary school level, but is required at the University of Corsica. It is available through adult education. It can be spoken in court or in the conduct of other government business if the officials concerned speak it. The Cultural Council of the Corsican Assembly advocates for its use, for example, on public signs.

In 2023, in a judgement initiated by local prefect and going in opposite direction of recent decades trends, usage of the Corsican language in French public offices and the regional parliament was legally banned, the existence of the "Corsican people" was also deemed unconstitutional.

Literature 
According to the anthropologist Dumenica Verdoni, writing new literature in modern Corsican, known as the Riacquistu, is an integral part of affirming Corsican identity. Some individuals have returned from careers in continental France to write in Corsican, including Dumenicu Togniotti, director of the Teatru Paisanu, which produced polyphonic musicals, 1973–1982, followed in 1980 by Michel Raffaelli's Teatru di a Testa Mora, and Saveriu Valentini's Teatru Cupabbia in 1984. Modern prose writers include Alanu di Meglio, Ghjacumu Fusina, Lucia Santucci, and Marcu Biancarelli.

There were writers working in Corsican in the 1700s and 1800s.

Ferdinand Gregorovius, a 19th-century traveller and enthusiast of Corsican culture, reported that the preferred form of the literary tradition of his time was the vocero, a type of polyphonic ballad originating from funeral obsequies. These laments were similar in form to the chorales of Greek drama except that the leader could improvise. Some performers were noted at this, such as the 1700s Mariola della Piazzole and Clorinda Franseschi. However, the trail of written popular literature of known date in Corsican currently goes no further back than the 17th century. An undated corpus of proverbs from communes may well precede it (see under External links below). Corsican has also left a trail of legal documents ending in the late 12th century. At that time the monasteries held considerable land on Corsica and many of the churchmen were notaries.

Between 1200 and 1425 the monastery of Gorgona, which belonged to the Order of Saint Benedict for much of that time and was in the territory of Pisa, acquired about 40 legal papers of various sorts related to Corsica. As the church was replacing Pisan prelates with Corsican ones there, the legal language shows a transition from entirely Latin through partially Latin and partially Corsican to entirely Corsican. The first known surviving document containing some Corsican is a bill of sale from Patrimonio dated to 1220. These documents were moved to Pisa before the monastery closed its doors and were published there. Research into earlier evidence of Corsican is ongoing.

Alphabet and spelling 

Corsican is written in the standard Latin script, using 21 of the letters for native words. The letters j, k, w, x, and y are found only in foreign names and French vocabulary. The digraphs and trigraphs chj, ghj, sc and sg are also defined as "letters" of the alphabet in its modern scholarly form (compare the presence of ch or ll in the old Spanish alphabet) and appear respectively after c, g and s.

The primary diacritic used is the grave accent, indicating word stress when it is not penultimate. In scholarly contexts, disyllables may be distinguished from diphthongs by use of the diaeresis on the former vowel (as in Italian and distinct from French and English). In older writing, the acute accent is sometimes found on stressed , the circumflex on stressed , indicating respectively and  phonemes.

Corsican has been regarded as a dialect of Italian historically, similar to the Romance lects developed on the Italian peninsula, and in writing, it also resembles Italian (with the generalised substitution of -u for final -o and the articles u and a for il/lo and la respectively; however, both the dialect of Cap Corse and Gallurese retain the original articles lu and la). On the other hand, the phonemes of the modern Corsican dialects have undergone complex and sometimes irregular phenomena depending on phonological context, so the pronunciation of the language for foreigners familiar with other Romance languages is not straightforward.

Phonology

Vowels 
As in Italian, the grapheme  appears in some digraphs and trigraphs in which it does not represent the phonemic vowel.

The combination is a digraph or trigraph indicating the nasalized vowel. The consonant is pronounced in weakened form. The same combination of letters might not be the digraph or trigraph but might be just the non-nasal vowel followed by the consonant at full weight. The speaker must know the difference. Example of nasal:  is pronounced  and not .

The Northern and central dialects in the vicinity of the Taravo river adopt the Italian seven-vowel system, whereas all the Southern ones around the so-called "archaic zone" with its centre being the town of Sartène (including the Gallurese dialect spoken in Northern Sardinia) resort to a five-vowel system without length differentiation, like Sardinian.

The vowel inventory, or collection of phonemic vowels (and the major allophones), transcribed in IPA symbols, is:

Consonants

See also 
 Corsican Wikipedia
 Gallurese dialect
 Languages of France
 Sassarese language

References

Bibliography 
Guarnerio P.E. (1902). Il sardo e il còrso in una nuova classificazione delle lingue romanze. AGI 16.
Tagliavini C. (1972). Le origini delle lingue neolatine. Bologna: Pàtron.
Giovanni Battista Pellegrini (1977). Carta dei dialetti d'Italia. Pisa: Pacini.
Jacques Fusina, Fernand Ettori (1981). Langue Corse Incertitudes et Paris. Ajaccio: Scola Corsa
Manlio Cortelazzo (1988). Gliederung der Sprachräume/Ripartizione dialettale, in Lexikon der Romanistischen Linguistik (LRL IV), edited by G. Holtus, M. Metzeltin e C. Schmitt, vol. IV, Tübingen, Niemeyer.
Régine Delamotte-Legrand, Frédéric François, Louis Porcher (1997). Langage, éthique, éducation: Perspectives croisées, Publications de l'Université de Rouen et du Havre.

Jean-Marie Arrighi (2002). Histoire de la Corse, Editions Jean-Paul Gisserot, Paris.
Jean-Marie Arrighi (2002). Histoire de la Langue Corse. Editions Jean-Paul Gisserot, Paris.
Fiorenzo Toso (2003). Lo spazio linguistico corso tra insularità e destino di frontiera. Linguistica (Ljubljana) letnik 43. številka 1.
Hervé Abalain (2007). Le français et les langues historiques de la France. Éditions Jean-Paul Gisserot.

Jean Sibille (2010). Langues de France et territoires : raison des choix et des dénominations In : Langue et espace. Pessac : Maison des Sciences de l’Homme d’Aquitaine.

External links 

 Corsican language, alphabet and pronunciation
 
 
 

 
Dialects of Italian
Languages of France
Languages of Sardinia